Janette Rauch (born 16 March 1962 in Winterthur, Switzerland) is a Swiss-German actress.

Life 
Janette Rauch grew up in Berlin as the daughter of a Swiss father. She was one of the original cast members of the musical Linie 1 at Berlin's Grips-Theater. She played the main role of "girl" until 1989. Since then, Rauch has been active in numerous German cinema and television films and series.

She became known to a wider audience through her role as Sister Christine in the 1990 movie  and her role in the ZDF series Zwei alte Hasen. She was often seen alongside Hape Kerkeling in some of his films. Since 6 November 2006, she starred in the telenovela Rote Rosen; after the departure of Angela Roy in episode 214, she took over the lead role of gardener Alice Albers.

Since 2011, she has been a permanent fixture on the ZDF evening series Notruf Hafenkante.

Rauch claims to have survived the 2006 tsunami in Sri Lanka.

She lives in Bremen, Germany.

Social engagement 
Janette Rauch is a Children's Ambassador for Bremer Children's Day and was, until 2010, the patron of the children's hospice Löwenherz in Syke (near Bremen).

Filmography 
 1987: 
 1988: Schafe in Wales
 1990: 
 1990–1993: Vera und Babs (26 episodes)
 1995: Das Traumschiff (TV series) – "Tasmanien"
 1996: Mensch, Pia! (TV series) (10 episodes)
 1996: Willi und die Windzors
 1997: Teneriffa – Tag der Rache (TV movie)
 1997–1999: Gegen den Wind (TV series) (15 episodes)
 1998: In aller Freundschaft
 1998: Die Oma ist tot
 1999: Herz über Bord
 1999–2001: Aus gutem Haus
 2000: Die Traumprinzen
 2001: Alles wegen Paul (film)
 2002: Rosamunde Pilcher: Mit den Augen der Liebe (TV movie)
 2004: Das Traumschiff (TV series) – "Sri Lanka"
 2004: Samba in Mettmann (film)
 2005: In aller Freundschaft
 2005: alphateam – Die Lebensretter im OP
 2006: Balko – "Tod eines Fahrlehrers"
 2006: Wilsberg: Tod auf Rezept
 2006–2008: Rote Rosen
 2008: Im Tal der wilden Rosen – "Zerrissene Herzen"
 2009: Küstenwache – "Duell ohne Gnade"
 2010 - 2018: Notruf Hafenkante
 2012: Zwei für alle Fälle (TV series) – "Manche mögen Mord"

References

External links 
 
 Homepage von Janette Rauch
 Homepage der Telenovela Rote Rosen

1962 births
Swiss television actresses
Living people
20th-century Swiss actresses
German television actresses
20th-century German actresses
21st-century German actresses
21st-century Swiss actresses
Actresses from Berlin